São Salvador may refer to:

 M'banza-Kongo, Angola, capital of Zaire Province and of the defunct Kongo Kingdom, known as São Salvador in Portuguese 1570-1975
 Salvador, Bahia, Brazil, capital of the State of Bahia
 São Salvador do Mundo, Cape Verde, a municipality on the island of Santiago

See also
 San Salvador (disambiguation)